Galleh Dar is a city in Fars Province, Iran.

Galleh Dar or Galeh Dar may also refer to:
 Galleh Dar, Bavanat, Fars Province
 Galleh Dar, Ilam
 Galleh Dar District, in Fars Province
 Galleh Dar Rural District, in Fars Province